Milton Klooster (born 26 November 1996) is a Dutch professional footballer who plays as a forward for Excelsior Maassluis.

Career
Klooster made his professional debut for AS Trenčín against Tatran Prešov on 4 March 2017.

Personal life
Milton Klooster has a twin brother, Rodney, who is also footballer who plays for Inter Turku.

References

External links
 
 Futbalnet Profile

Living people
1996 births
People from Vlaardingen
Dutch footballers
Association football forwards
AS Trenčín players
FK Inter Bratislava players
FC Lisse players
Excelsior Maassluis players
2. Liga (Slovakia) players
Slovak Super Liga players
Tweede Divisie players
Dutch expatriate footballers
Dutch expatriate sportspeople in Slovakia
Expatriate footballers in Slovakia
Footballers from South Holland